NGC 1487 is an irregular galaxy in the constellation Eridanus. It was discovered by James Dunlop on Oct 29, 1826.

It is thought to be the remnant of two galaxies, which are the components NGC 1487E and NGC 1487W, that collided about 500 million years ago.

See also
 List of NGC objects (1001–2000)

Gallery

References

External links
 

Interacting galaxies
Spiral galaxies
Eridanus (constellation)
1487
Dorado Group
014117